Terrence Warde (born 2 January 1989) is a West Indian cricketer from Saint Kitts. He made his first-class debut for the Leeward Islands in the 2017–18 Regional Four Day Competition on 26 October 2017. He made his List A debut for the Leeward Islands in the 2017–18 Regional Super50 on 2 February 2018.

References

External links
 

1989 births
Living people
Leeward Islands cricketers
Place of birth missing (living people)
Kittitian cricketers